Cécile de France (born 17 July 1975) is a Belgian actress. After achieving success in French cinema hits such as L'Art (délicat) de la séduction (2001) and Irène (2002), she gained international attention for her lead roles in High Tension (2003) and Hereafter (2010).

Life and career 
Born in Namur, she left Belgium at the age of 17 to go to Paris where she studied theatre for two years with actor Jean Paul Denizon, assistant to British director Peter Brook. She then spent three years (1995–98) at the acting academy ENSATT (École Nationale Supérieure des Arts et Techniques du Théâtre) in the Département Comédie first at the Rue Blanche in Paris, then in Lyon. She was discovered by the agent Dominique Besnehard and appeared in French hit films such as L'Art (délicat) de la séduction (2001) and Irène (2002).

Her international breakthrough came with the horror film High Tension (2003, UK title: Switchblade Romance, US title: High Tension). She caught the eye of Hollywood producers and soon landed her first major role in a US feature, Around the World in 80 Days (2004), in which she starred alongside Jackie Chan and Steve Coogan.

She won two César Awards for Most Promising Actress in L'Auberge espagnole (2002), and Best Supporting Actress in Les Poupées russes (2005).

In 2014, she hosted the 39th César Awards ceremony.

She was selected to be on the jury for the Cinéfondation and short films sections of the 2015 Cannes Film Festival. She was also selected to be on the jury for the main competition section of the 68th Berlin International Film Festival.

She has two children, Lino and Joy, with musician Guillaume Siron.

In 2019, she was cast in Wes Anderson's film The French Dispatch.

Filmography

Film

Short film

Television

Theatre
1996 : Dormez je le veux by Georges Feydeau, directed by Benoît Blampain
1996 : Une palette rouge sang by Valeria Moretti, directed by Jean Paul Denizon
1996 : Le songe d'une nuit d'été by William Shakespeare, directed by Pierre Pradinas
1997 : Variations Strindberg-Feydeau, directed by Nada Strancar
1998 : Pour nous, directed by Serguei Issayev
1998 : Tu serais un ange tombé du ciel exprès pour nous by N. Sadour and A. Vampilov
1999, 2000 : Electre, by Sophocle, directed by Claudia Stavisky
1999 : Le baladin du monde occidental de John Millington Synge, directed by Philippe Delaigue
2001 : Mademoiselle Julie by August Strindberg, directed by Gwenaël Morin
2001 : SC35C, by Jean-Michel Frère

Awards and nominations

References

External links

  Official web site
 
 
 

1975 births
Living people
People from Andenne
Best Supporting Actress César Award winners
Belgian film actresses
20th-century Belgian actresses
21st-century Belgian actresses
Most Promising Actress Lumières Award winners
Most Promising Actress César Award winners